Events from the year 1646 in art.

Events
 (unknown)

Paintings

 Georges de La Tour - The Smoker
Claude Lorrain
The Judgement of Paris (c.1645-46)
Landscape with Hagar and the Angel
Carlo Dolci - Saint Andrew Praying Before his Crucifixion
Gerrit Dou - Girl Chopping Onions
Guercino
Annunciation
The Circumcision
Saul Attacking David
Murillo - The Angels' Kitchen
Karel Škréta - The Crucifixion (St. Nicholas Church, Prague)
Kano Sansetsu - Old Plum 

Philips Wouwerman - Cavalry making a Sortie from a Fort on a Hill

Births
January 6 - Jan Van Cleef, Flemish painter (died 1716)
February 10 - Hans Adam Weissenkircher, Austrian Baroque court painter (died 1695)
April 20 - Giacinto Calandrucci,  Italian painter at the studio of Carlo Maratta (died 1707)
August 8 - Godfrey Kneller, portrait painter in England (died 1723)
date unknown
Andrea Belvedere, Italian painter (died unknown)
Lorenzo Bergonzoni, Italian painter (died 1700)
Juan Correa, Mexican painter of primarily religious themes (died 1716)
Pietro Dandini, Italian painter active in Florence (died 1712)
Benoît Farjat, French engraver (died 1724)
José García Hidalgo, Spanish Baroque painter (died 1719)
Francesco Monti, Italian painter of battle scenes (died 1712)
Pietro Paolo Raggi, Italian Caravaggisti painter of Bacchanal and landscape subjects (died 1724)
probable - Jean-Baptiste Corneille, French painter, etcher, and engraver (died 1695)

Deaths
April 10 - Santino Solari, Swiss architect and sculptor (born 1576)
August 19 - Francesco Furini, Italian Baroque painter from Florence (born 1600/1603)
October 28 (bur.) - William Dobson, English portrait painter (born 1611)
date unknown
Alessandro Albini, Italian painter of the early Baroque period (born 1568)
Antonio Bisquert, Spanish painter of the Baroque period (born 1596)
Huang Daozhou, Chinese calligrapher, scholar and official of the Ming Dynasty (born 1585)
Daniel Dumonstier, French portraitist in crayon (born 1574)
Isaack Gilsemans, Dutch merchant and artist (born 1606)
Ludovico Lana, Italian painter, mainly active in Modena (born 1597)
Niccolo Laniere, Italian painter and engraver (born 1608)
probable - Giovanni Stefano Marucelli, Italian painter and architect active mainly in Tuscany (born 1586)

References

 
Years of the 17th century in art
1640s in art